"Ain't No Woman (Like the One I've Got)" is a song written by Dennis Lambert and Brian Potter, released as a single by the Four Tops on the ABC/Dunhill record label, from the album Keeper of the Castle.  It peaked at number four on the U.S. Billboard Hot 100 the weeks of April 7 and 14, 1973, number one on the Cash Box Top 100 the latter of those two weeks, and became a gold record.

The song was originally recorded by the singing trio of Hamilton, Joe Frank & Reynolds and released on their 1972 album, Hallway Symphony.

The Four Tops' hit version was led by longtime singer Levi Stubbs, and included special co-lead spots by the other Tops, Lawrence Payton, Renaldo "Obie" Benson and Abdul "Duke" Fakir, in that respective order during the chorus.  The words tell about the love a man feels for the woman with whom he is having a relationship.

It was the Four Tops' second single release on ABC after leaving Motown in 1972, and became their most successful post-Motown top 40 hit, reaching number four on the US Pop Singles chart. It was also another big success for the group on the US R&B Singles chart, where it peaked at number two.

Chart performance

Weekly charts

Year-end charts

Other cover versions
Additional interpretations include those by: Pete Marquez, Bloodfire Posse; Mel Brown; East Coast Band; The Friends of Distinction; Home T; Kashif; Louie; Johnny Mathis; and Melvin Sparks. 
The song was later reinterpreted by Jay-Z and Foxy Brown in their 1996 hit, "Ain't No Nigga".

Personnel
Lead and background vocals by Levi Stubbs, Lawrence Payton, Renaldo "Obie" Benson and Abdul "Duke" Fakir
Produced by Dennis Lambert
 Tony Terran - trumpet

References

1973 singles
Four Tops songs
Songs written by Brian Potter (musician)
Songs written by Dennis Lambert
1972 songs
ABC Records singles
Dunhill Records singles
Cashbox number-one singles